Tiong Bahru Park is a public park between Henderson, Bukit Merah and Lower Delta Road in Singapore. First developed around 1967, it combined with a nursery site in 1977 and in 2000, it was redeveloped.

See also
 List of Parks in Singapore
 National Parks Board

References

External links
 Tiong Bahru Park at National Parks Board website

Parks in Singapore